Lepidodactylus moestus is a species of gecko. It is found in the Marshall Islands, Federated States of Micronesia, and Palau.

References

Lepidodactylus
Reptiles described in 1867
Taxa named by Wilhelm Peters